European route E11 is a road, part of the International E-road network. It begins in Orléans and ends in Béziers, France.

It takes up the entire French autoroutes A71 and A75.

The route also passes (but does not cross) the Viaduc de Garabit, which was built in the 1880s by Gustave Eiffel.

External links 
 UN Economic Commission for Europe: Overall Map of E-road Network (2007)

11
E011